Conrad Porta (1541-1585) was a  Lutheran pastor of Mansfeld, and author of theologian tracts of the first generation following Martin Luther.
His most notable work is the Jungfrawen-Spiegel ("Mirror of Virgins", so called after the medieval Speculum Virginum) of 1580 which he wrote on the request of the widowed Margareta von Mansfeld-Hinterort, duchess of Braunschweig-Lüneburg (1534-1596).

References
M. J. Haemig and Robert Kolb, "Preaching in Lutheran Pulpits in the Age of Confessionalization" in Kolb (ed.), Lutheran Ecclesiastical Culture: 1550–1675 (2008), p. 143.

External links
Post-Reformation Digital Library

German Lutheran theologians
1541 births
1585 deaths
16th-century German Protestant theologians
German male non-fiction writers
16th-century German male writers